Hermesh (lit. Scythe) is an Israeli settlement in the western Samarian hills of the West Bank. Founded in 1984, it is organised as a community settlement and falls under the jurisdiction of Shomron Regional Council.

The international community considers Israeli settlements in the West Bank to be illegal, but the Israeli government disputes this.

History
Hermesh was established in 1984 by the Mishkei Herut Beitar settlement organization. Most of the residents of Hermesh are secular Jews or non-Jews. More than half of the population are new immigrants, mainly from the former Soviet Union. Their motivation for living in the region is not ideology but quality of life.

On 29 October 2002, three residents of Hermesh, Orna Eshel (53), Hadas Turgeman (14), and Linoy Saroussi (14) were shot dead by a Palestinian gunman who entered the village armed with a Kalashnikov. A soldier and a resident were wounded in the attack. Al-Aqsa Martyrs' Brigades claimed responsibility.

On 20 June 2005, a resident of Hermesh, Yevgeny Reider (28) was killed in a shooting attack near Baqa ash-Sharqiyya, in the northern West Bank. Islamic Jihad claimed responsibility for the attack.

References

Israeli settlements in the West Bank
Populated places established in 1984
1984 establishments in the Palestinian territories